Alida Sims Malkus (September 19, 1888 – September 27, 1976) was an American writer of children's books, primarily nonfiction and historical novels "insubstantially tinged with fantasy". She was a Newbery Honor winner.

Biography
Born September 19, 1888, Malkus was the eleventh child out of thirteen living in Bay City, Michigan, and spent most of her time swimming and riding horses for entertainment. During high school at the age of thirteen she wrote articles for the school newspaper, she also wrote plays and enjoyed putting on productions for her neighborhood friends. Two years later, her mother was not well and had to move to San Francisco. During her trip she fell deeply in love with the desert and decided to live in New Mexico, where she spent a great deal of time with the Native Americans living in the region. This is where she developed her interest in Southwest Native Americans, Mayan ruins and other pre-Columbian civilizations which inspired most of her books.

The Dark Star of Itza: The Story of a Pagan Princess was one runner-up for the 1931 Newbery Medal.

Works 
 The Dark Star of Itza: The Story of a Pagan Princess, illustrated by Lowell Houser (1930)
 The Spindle Imp and Other Tales of Maya Myth and Folk Lore, illus. Erick Berry (1931), 
 Eastward Sweeps the Current: A Saga of the Polynesian Seafarers (1937)
 The Silver Llama (1939)
 The Citadel of a Hundred Stairways (1941)
 Constancia Lona (1947)
 The Story of Louis Pasteur (1952)
 The Story of Good Queen Bess (1953)
 We Were There at the Battle of Gettysburg (1955)
 The Story of Winston Churchill (1957)
 Young Inca Prince (1957)
 The Sea and Its Rivers (1957)
 Through the Wall (1962)
 There Really Was a Hiawatha (1963)
 Animals of the High Andes (1966)
 The Story of Jacqueline Kennedy (1967)
 The Amazon: River of Promise (1970)

References

External links 

 

1888 births
1976 deaths
American children's writers
American young adult novelists
Children's non-fiction writers
Newbery Honor winners
20th-century American women writers
20th-century American novelists
American women children's writers
American women novelists
Women writers of young adult literature
Novelists from New York (state)
People from Bay City, Michigan